Walsall South is a constituency represented in the House of Commons of the UK Parliament since 2010 by Valerie Vaz, a member of the Labour Party.

Members of Parliament

Constituency profile
The constituency is in the heart of an area traditionally focussed on manufacturing, see Walsall, which retains many mechanical and engineering jobs in its economy and this seat has good links to the cities of Wolverhampton and Birmingham.

Workless claimants, registered jobseekers, were in November 2012 higher than the national average of 3.8% and regional average of 4.7%, at 7.7% of the population based on a statistical compilation by The Guardian.

Boundaries

Walsall South is one of three constituencies in the metropolitan borough and specifically covers Darlaston, Moxley, Pheasey and the southern part of Walsall.

2010–present: The Metropolitan Borough of Walsall wards of Bentley and Darlaston North, Darlaston South, Paddock, Palfrey, Pheasey Park Farm, Pleck, and St Matthew's.

1983–2010: The Metropolitan Borough of Walsall wards of Bentley and Darlaston North, Darlaston South, Paddock, Palfrey, Pheasey, Pleck, and St Matthew's.

1974–1983: The County Borough of Walsall wards of Darlaston North, Darlaston South, Hatherton, Paddock, Palfrey, Pleck, and St Matthew's.

1955–1974: The County Borough of Walsall wards of Bridge, Caldmore, Paddock, Palfrey, and Pleck, and the Urban District of Aldridge.

History
The constituency was first contested in 1955 largely from Walsall constituency, and won by its only Conservative MP to date, Major-General Sir Henry d'Avigdor-Goldsmid.

Bruce George of the Labour Party won the seat when the Major-General stood down in the February 1974 general election, he too was a prominent supporter of the armed services and led Britain's NATO delegation to its Parliament, subsequently becoming its vice-president. While never a prominent frontbencher, George held Walsall South until his retirement at the 2010 general election, when he was succeeded by Valerie Vaz (also of the Labour Party).

Synopsis of results
The Conservative holding of the seat through the First Wilson Ministry reveals that in these early elections the seat was not a bellwether. On the 1974 transfer in power to Wilson again, here the result proved to be a watershed election. Labour's majorities since this, only in fairly good years for the Conservatives, such as during the Thatcher ministry as well as in 1992 and 2010 and 2019 general elections have been marginal. In terms of length of a party's representation, Labour has represented this area continuously for a total of 45 years as of 2019.

Elections

Elections in the 2010s

Elections in the 2000s

Elections in the 1990s

Elections in the 1980s

Elections in the 1970s

Elections in the 1960s

Elections in the 1950s

See also
 List of parliamentary constituencies in the West Midlands (county)

Notes

References

Politics of Walsall
Parliamentary constituencies in the West Midlands (county)
Constituencies of the Parliament of the United Kingdom established in 1955